Shila may refer to:

People
Shila (Nestorian patriarch), Patriarch of the Church of the East from 503 to 523
Shila of Kefar Tamarta, a Jewish Talmudist, an amora of the 3rd century
Shilabhattarika, a 9th-century Sanskrit poet from India

Other uses
Shila Devi, the famous idol of Durga, the form of mother goddess in Shaktism
Shila (film), a 1982 Indian Malayalam film

See also
Sila (murti)
Sheela (disambiguation)
Śīla (Buddhist ethics)
Chila (disambiguation)